Lajeado is a district in the subprefecture of Guaianases of the city of São Paulo.

References

Districts of São Paulo